Malia Rose Steinmetz (born 18 January 1999) is a New Zealand footballer who plays as a midfielder for Western Sydney Wanderers and the New Zealand women's national team.

Steinmetz was a member of the New Zealand U-17 side at the 2016 FIFA U-17 Women's World Cup in Jordan, the New Zealand U-20 side at the 2016 FIFA U-20 Women's World Cup in Papua New Guinea, and again at the 2018 FIFA U-20 Women's World Cup in France.

Steinmetz made her senior début as a substitute in a 5–0 win over Thailand on 28 November 2017.

References

Living people
1999 births
Women's association football midfielders
Association footballers from Auckland
New Zealand women's association footballers
New Zealand women's international footballers
Perth Glory FC (A-League Women) players
Western Sydney Wanderers FC (A-League Women) players
Expatriate women's soccer players in Australia
New Zealand expatriate sportspeople in Australia
New Zealand expatriate women's association footballers